Tome VI, released in 1977, is the first live album by the French progressive rock band Ange.

Track listing
(lengths taken from the CD release)

Side One:
"Fils De Lumière" (Christian Decamps, Francis Decamps) – 04:33
"Les Longues Nuits D'Isaac" (Christian Decamps, Francis Decamps) – 04:27
"Ballade Pour Une Orgie" (Christian Decamps, Jean-Michel Brezovar) – 04:38
"Ode À Émile" (Christian Decamps, Jean-Michel Brezovar) – 03:45
Side Two:
"Dignité" (R. Lombardo, Francis Decamps) – 15:51
Side Three:
"Le Chien, La Poubelle Et La Rose" (Christian Decamps, Francis Decamps) – 13:12
"Sur La Trace Des Fées" (Christian Decamps, Jean-Michel Brezovar) – 05:11
Side Four:
"Hymne À La Vie" (Christian Decamps, Jean-Michel Brezovar) (tot. 13:45)
"Cantique" (Christian Decamps, Jean-Michel Brezovar) – 05:23
"Procession" (Christian Decamps, Jean-Michel Brezovar) – 05:22
"Hymne" (Christian Decamps, Jean-Michel Brezovar) – 03:00
"Ces Gens-Là" (Jacques Brel) – 06:02

CD Track listing
"Fils De Lumière" (Christian Decamps, Francis Decamps) – 04:33
"Les Longues Nuits D'Isaac" (Christian Decamps, Francis Decamps) – 04:27
"Ballade Pour Une Orgie" (Christian Decamps, Jean-Michel Brezovar) – 04:38
"Ode À Émile" (Christian Decamps, Jean-Michel Brezovar) – 03:45
"Dignité" (R. Lombardo, Francis Decamps) – 15:51
"Le Chien, La Poubelle Et La Rose" (Christian Decamps, Francis Decamps) – 13:12
"Sur La Trace Des Fées" (Christian Decamps, Jean-Michel Brezovar) – 05:11
"Hymne À La Vie 1: Cantique" (Christian Decamps, Jean-Michel Brezovar) – 05:23
"Hymne À La Vie 2: Procession" (Christian Decamps, Jean-Michel Brezovar) – 05:22
"Hymne À La Vie 3: Hymne" (Christian Decamps, Jean-Michel Brezovar) – 03:00
"Ces Gens-Là" (Jacques Brel) – 06:02

Personnel
 Christian Decamps – vocals, piano, percussion, accordion
 Jean Michel Brezovar – electric guitar, acoustic guitar, vocals
 Francis Decamps – organ, A.R.P. synthesizer, mellotron, vocals
 Daniel Haas – bass, acoustic guitar
 Jean Pierre Guichard – drums, percussion, harmonica, vocals

References
Tome VI : Live 1977 on ange-updlm (in french)
Tome VI : Live 1977 on www.discogs.com.

Ange albums
1977 live albums